A Bag of Marbles is a 2017 French drama film directed by Christian Duguay, based on the autobiographical novel A Bag of Marbles by Joseph Joffo. It is the second time the novel has been made into a film after Un sac de billes (1975). The film won the Best Narrative Audience Award at the Philadelphia Jewish Film Festival 37. The film was also a jury prize competitor at the Atlanta Jewish Film Festival.

Plot
In occupied France during World War II, two young Jewish brothers, Maurice and Joseph, are sent by their parents to the Italian Zone, and display courage, intelligence and ingenuity as they escape the occupiers and try to reunite their family.

At the very end of the film, Maurice and Joseph, who became barbers like their father, are shown in the present day (2017) in a Paris cafe.

Cast and characters

 Dorian Le Clech as Joseph
 Batyste Fleurial as Maurice
 Patrick Bruel as Roman
 Elsa Zylberstein as Anna
 Bernard Campan as Amboise Mancelier
 Kev Adams as Ferdinand
 Christian Clavier as Doctor Rosen
 César Domboy as Henri
 Ilian Bergala as Albert
 Emile Berling as Raoul Mancelier
 Jocelyne Desverchère as Marcelle Mancelier
 Coline Leclère as Françoise
 Holger Daemgen as Alois Brunner
 Michael Smadja as Simon
 Lucas Prisor as German Controller
 Frédéric Épaud as the priest Buffa

Reception
On review aggregator website Rotten Tomatoes, the film holds an approval rating of 83% based on 24 reviews, and an average rating of 7.3/10. On Metacritic, the film has a weighted average score of 55 out of 100, based on 7 critics, indicating "mixed or average reviews".

Hannah Brown of The Jerusalem Post called A Bag of Marbles "One of the best movies told about the holocaust from a child’s point of view".

The film was shot in the south of France and in Žatec, Czech Republic.

References

External links
 

2017 drama films
French drama films
2010s French-language films
Films set in France
Films directed by Christian Duguay (director)
Canadian drama films
French-language Canadian films
2010s Canadian films
2010s French films